Skylynx may refer to:

 BAE Systems Skylynx II, an unmanned aerial vehicle
 YVR Skylynx, a Canadian bus operator
 Sky Lynx, a character from the Transformers franchise

See also
 Skylink (disambiguation)